Luke Branighan (born 29 June 1981) is an Australian former professional rugby league footballer who played in the 2000s.

He is the nephew of both Ray Branighan and Arthur Branighan.

Career
Branighan made his debut with St George Illawarra halfway through 2000. He remained in the first-grade team for the rest of the season, playing in the halves with Trent Barrett. He joined the Sharks in 2001, but made only one further NRL appearance.

While playing for New South Wales Cup side Balmain Tigers in 2005, Branighan was selected to tour with the Malta Knights. In 2009 he played for the Gateshead Thunder and in 2010 he played for Halifax in the Co-operative Championship.

Returning to Australia, Branighan played for Mounties in the Bundaberg Red Cup in 2011. In 2012, he became captain-coach of the Young Cherrypickers in the Group 9 competition.

References

External links
Halifax profile
Gateshead Thunder profile

1981 births
Living people
Australian people of Maltese descent
Australian rugby league players
Cronulla-Sutherland Sharks players
Halifax R.L.F.C. players
Malta national rugby league team players
Newcastle Thunder players
Place of birth missing (living people)
Rugby league five-eighths
St. George Illawarra Dragons players